Vicious Cycle is the twelfth studio album by Lynyrd Skynyrd, released in 2003. It was the first album recorded by the band following the death of original bassist Leon Wilkeson, who appears on two songs, "The Way" and "Lucky Man", and the song "Mad Hatter" is a tribute to him. The album is the first to feature bassist Ean Evans, the first mainstream album with Michael Cartellone on drums (who had previously appeared on Christmas Time Again), and the last album that guitarist Hughie Thomasson played on before he died. It included the single "Red, White & Blue" which peaked at number 27 on the US Mainstream Rock charts.

Track listing
"That's How I Like It" (Blair Daly, Rickey Medlocke, Gary Rossington, Hughie Thomasson, Johnny Van Zant) – 4:33
"Pick Em Up" (Tom Hambridge, Medlocke, J. Van Zant) – 4:20
"Dead Man Walkin (Kevin Bowe, Medlocke, Rossington, Thomasson, J. Van Zant) – 4:30
"The Way" (Medlocke, Rossington, Thomasson, J. Van Zant) – 5:32
"Red, White, & Blue" (Donnie Van Zant, J. Van Zant, Brad Warren, Brett Warren) – 5:31
"Sweet Mama" (Hambridge, D. Van Zant, Robert White Johnson) – 3:59
"All Funked Up" (Medlocke, Jim Peterik, Rossington, Thomasson, J. Van Zant) – 3:33
"Hell or Heaven" (Medlocke, Peterik, Rossington, Thomasson, J. Van Zant) – 5:14
"Mad Hatter" (Hambridge, Medlocke, Rossington, Thomasson, J. Van Zant, Cartellone, Evans, Powell, Chase, Krantz) – 5:38
"Rockin' Little Town" (Hambridge, Medlocke, Rossington, Thomasson, J. Van Zant) – 3:36
"Crawl" (Medlocke, Peterik, Rossington, Thomasson, J. Van Zant) – 5:09
"Jake" (Hambridge, Medlocke, Rossington, Thomasson, J. Van Zant) – 3:41
"Life's Lessons" (Medlocke, Peterik, Rossington, Thomasson, J. Van Zant) – 5:59
"Lucky Man" (Medlocke, Rossington, Thomasson, J. Van Zant) – 5:35
"Gimme Back My Bullets" (Bonus Track featuring Kid Rock) (Rossington, Ronnie Van Zant) – 3:41

Personnel 
Lynyrd Skynyrd
 
 Gary Rossington – guitars
 Billy Powell – keyboards
 Ean Evans – bass guitar
Michael Cartellone – drums
 Rickey Medlocke – guitars & vocals, co-lead vocals on "Pick Em Up", harmonica
 Hughie Thomasson – guitars & background vocals
 Leon Wilkeson - bass guitar on "The Way" and "Lucky Man"
 Johnny Van Zant – lead vocals, harmonica  
Additional personnel
 Carol Chase – background vocals
 Perry Coleman - backing vocals
 Melody Crittendon - backing vocals
 Eric Darken - percussion
 Chris Dunn - trombone
 Tom Hambridge - backing vocals
 John Hobbs - organ, piano
 Jim Horn - baritone saxophone
 Dale Krantz-Rossington – background vocals
 Sam Levine - tenor saxophone
 Greg Morrow - drums
 Gordon Mote - organ
 Nashville String Machine - strings
 Steve Patrick - trumpet
 Kid Rock – co-lead vocals on "Gimme Back My Bullets"
 Brent Rowan - tiple
 Brad Warren - backing vocals 
 Brett Warren - backing vocals
 Biff Watson - bouzouki, acoustic guitar

Chart performance

Album

Singles

References

Lynyrd Skynyrd albums
2003 albums
Sanctuary Records albums